The San Miguel Archangel Parish Church, commonly referred to as Orion Church, is a 16th-century, Baroque church located at Brgy. San Vicente, Orion, Bataan, Philippines. The parish church, dedicated to Saint Michael, the Archangel, is under the jurisdiction of the Roman Catholic Diocese of Balanga. A marker bearing the brief history of the structure has been installed in its façade by the National Historical Committee, precursor of the National Historical Commission of the Philippines. The current priest of the parish church is Fr. Percival V. Medina, with Fr. Maximo D. Villanueva, Jr. serve as parochial vicar.

Parish and Architectural History
Orion was established by the Dominican Priests on April 30, 1667. The present-day 19th-century church was built by Father Jose Campomanes, OP after an earthquake in 1852 which destroyed the previous structure.

Architecture and Ornamentation

Exterior
The church façade is of barn-style Baroque, a style that has been described as typically found in most Spanish-era churches in the Philippines. It features side pillars capped by urn-like finials, pilasters that divide the façade into five segments and cornices that divide the expanse of the wall into two levels. The pediment is semi-arched and ends into two small volutes before tapering down to the sides. It is adorned by a framed saint's niche flanked by two hexagonal windows. A concrete porte cochere has been added later into the structure. To the left of the church rises the four-level, slender belfry. The two uppermost levels are octagonal and are pierced with rectangular, circular and semicircular arched campanile windows.

Interior

The main altarpiece or retablo, which was done in the early 18th century, is done in Rococo style.

See also
 Roman Catholicism in the Philippines
 Roman Catholic Diocese of Balanga
 Balanga Cathedral

References

External links

 Official Website of the Roman Catholic Diocese of Balanga

Roman Catholic churches in Bataan
Spanish Colonial architecture in the Philippines
Baroque architecture in the Philippines
Churches in the Roman Catholic Diocese of Balanga